OSS/BSS, in telecommunications, refer to operations support system and business support system. The distinction emphasizes a separation of concerns between maintaining network operations and the business around which that network is built. Communications service providers support a broad range of services and functions with their OSS/BSS. BSS primarily consists of order capture, Customer Relationship Management and Telecommunications billing whereas OSS covers Order Management, Network Inventory Management and Network Operations.

History
Previously OSS and BSS were more clearly separate entities but the term OSS/BSS (or occasionally BSS/OSS) has been in use since at least 2000. The interface, for example, between the BSS capturing an order and the OSS fulfilling it could be quite simple. The interfaces and models needed for OSS and BSS systems and scaling (also a Video).

Now, with more complicated and differentiated products and services being offered much closer liaison between the two is required, for example processing an order may require information on the services the customer already has, the network they are using, and currently available resources.

Use in VoIP and Unified Communications
Service providers in this area have even more requirements for an integrated OSS/BSS system.
Examples include eCommerce, self-management, real time reporting, and fraud prevention.

References

Telecommunications